Eugenia mackeeana is a species of plant in the family Myrtaceae. It is endemic to New Caledonia.

References

Endemic flora of New Caledonia
mackeeana
Vulnerable plants
Taxonomy articles created by Polbot